is a Japanese manga series written by Kenzō Irie and illustrated by Takashi Hashiguchi. It was serialized in Shogakukan's Weekly Shōnen Sunday from December 2007 to February 2010, with its chapters collected in eleven tankōbon volumes. A sequel, titled Saijō no Meii: The King of Neet, was serialized in the same magazine from March 2010 to April 2014, with its chapters collected in nineteen tankōbon volumes. 

A ten-episode Japanese television drama adaptation was broadcast on TV Tokyo from January to March 2011. Three special episodes aired in February 2016, August 2017 and October 2019.

Media

Manga
Saijō no Meii''', written by Kenzō Irie and illustrated by Takashi Hashiguchi, was serialized in Shogakukan's Weekly Shōnen Sunday from December 5, 2007, to February 24, 2010. Shogakukan collected its chapters in eleven tankōbon volumes, released from April 18, 2008, to June 19, 2010.

A sequel, titled , was serialized in Weekly Shōnen Sunday from March 31, 2010, to April 30, 2014. Shogakukan collected its chapters in nineteen tankōbon'' volumes, released from July 16, 2010, to June 18, 2014.

Volume list

Saijō no Meii

Saijō no Meii: The King of Neet

Drama
A Japanese television drama adaptation was announced in October 2010. The series ran for 10 episodes on TV Tokyo from January 10 to March 14, 2011. 3 special episodes aired on February 10, 2016, August 23, 2017, and October 2, 2019.

References

External links
Saijō no Meii manga official website at Web Sunday 
 
 
 
 

Medical anime and manga
Shogakukan manga
Shōnen manga